The Javad uezd, known after 1921 as the Salyan uezd, was a county (uezd) within the Baku Governorate of the Russian Empire and then of the Azerbaijan Democratic Republic and Azerbaijan SSR until its formal abolishment in 1929 by the Soviet authorities. The uezd was located in the central part of the governorate, bordering the Geokchay, Shemakha, and Baku uezds to the north, Caspian sea to the east, Lenkoran uezd to the south and Iran to the west. The administrative center of the uezd was the city of Salyan.

Administrative divisions 
The subcounties (uchastoks) of the Javad uezd in 1912 were as follows:

History
Javad uezd was formed in 1868 as part of the Baku Governorate of the Russian Empire. It was abolished in 1929 by Soviet authorities.

Demographics
According to the Brockhaus and Efron Encyclopedic Dictionary, published in the late 19th and early 20th centuries, 94,690 people lived in the uezd, mainly Tatars (later known as Azerbaijanis)

Russian Empire Census 
The majority of the population indicated Tatar to be their mother tongue, with a significant Russian speaking minority.

Kavkazskiy kalendar 

Soviet census (1926) 
According to the 1926 census, the population of the uezd was 129,367.

See also
 Javad Khanate

Notes

References

Bibliography 

Geographic history of Azerbaijan
States and territories established in 1840
1840 establishments in the Russian Empire
1929 disestablishments in the Soviet Union
Uezds of Baku Governorate
Uezds of the Soviet Union
States and territories disestablished in 1929